Quinto Vercellese is a comune (municipality) in the Province of Vercelli in the Italian region Piedmont, located about  northeast of Turin and about  northwest of Vercelli.

Quinto Vercellese borders the following municipalities: Caresanablot, Collobiano, Olcenengo, and Oldenico.

References

Cities and towns in Piedmont